Kenya Mortgage Refinance Company Plc (KMRC), is a financial services company in Kenya, that specializes in lending to other financial institutions in the country, for onward lending in form of mortgages. In addition, KMRC buys good mortgages from other lenders to make more money available to banks for onward lending to eligible homeowners. It also plans to "invest in government debt securities or other guaranteed debt".

Overview
The institution is a greenfield start-up, established in August 2018, as a public private partnership between the government of Kenya and the major mortgage lenders in the country. As of July 2020 it had shareholders equity of KES:2 billion (US$20 million), with committed total assets of KES:37 billion (US$351 million). At that time KMRC was awaiting regulatory approval to commence business operations.

Operations
KMRC will be regulated and supervised by the Central Bank of Kenya. The KMRC Board of Directors will comprise seven individuals who will set policy that will govern and guide the company. The World Bank and the African Development Bank have committed to lend KES:25 billion (US$250 million) and KES:10 billion (US$100 million) respectively, to KMRC.

It is expected that KMRC will provide financing to mortgage institutions at 5 percent for onward lending at 7 percent to homeowners earning less than KES:150,000 (US$1,500) per month. Such a homeowner could borrow up to KES:4 million (US$40,000), paying KES:31,000 (US$310) monthly, for 20 consecutive years. This is approximately 50 percent of the least expensive mortgage product on the market, before KMRC began operations.

Ownership
As of July 2020, the shareholders in the stock of Kenya Mortgage Refinance Company are as illustrated in the table below. Reliable sources have put the government's shareholding at 25 percent.

Licensing
In September 2020, the Central Bank of Kenya granted an operating license to KMRC. Homebuyers in the Nairobi Metropolitan Area, which covers Nairobi County, Kajiado County, Kiambu County and Machakos County, can finance up to a maximum of  KSh4 million, through KMRC. For Kenya's remaining 43 counties, the maximum mortgage is KSh3 million.

Operations
In December 2020, KMRC advanced the first four mortgage lenders varying amounts of money for onward lending to their customers. The funds are lent to the banks and Saccos at 5 percent per annum and the money is on-lent to mortgage customers at 10 percent per annum or less. The tale below illustrates the distribution of the first tranche to loans by KMRC to qualifying mortgage lenders. The lenders have seven years to repay the loans to KMRC.

See also

 List of banks in Kenya
 Central Bank of Kenya
 Economy of Kenya

References

External links
 Official Webpage
 Website of Central Bank of Kenya

Banks of Kenya
Banks established in 2018
2018 establishments in Kenya
Companies based in Nairobi